Champdor-Corcelles is a commune in the Ain department of eastern France. The municipality was established on 1 January 2016 and consists of the former communes of Champdor and Corcelles.

See also 
Communes of the Ain department

References 

Communes of Ain
Communes nouvelles of Ain
Populated places established in 2016
2016 establishments in France
Ain communes articles needing translation from French Wikipedia